Junkyard may refer to:

 Wrecking yard, also known as a junkyard, salvage yard or scrap yard
 Junkyard (album), by Australian band The Birthday Party
 Junkyard (band), a hard rock band based in Los Angeles
 Junkyard, a dog from G.I. Joe who is owned by Joe member Mutt 
 Junkyard, a Junkion from The Transformers
"Junkyard", a song by Zac Brown Band
"Junkyard", a song from In the Junkyard

See also
Junkyard Dog (disambiguation)
Junkyard Wars, an engineering game show